Ted O'Sullivan may refer to:

 Timothy O'Sullivan (Fianna Fáil politician) (1899–1971), known as Ted, Irish Fianna Fáil Party politician from West Cork
 Ted O'Sullivan (hurler) (1920–1968), Irish hurler